The Mission golden-eyed tree frog or Amazon milk frog (Trachycephalus resinifictrix) is a large species of arboreal frog native to the Amazon Rainforest in South America. It is sometimes referred to as the blue milk frog. It was first discovered along the Maracanã River in Brazil. This species was previously within the genus Phrynohyas, which was recently synonymized with Trachycephalus.

Description 
Adult frogs are light grey in colour with brown or black banding, while juveniles will exhibit stronger contrasts. As they age, their skin develops a slightly bumpy texture. Their blood tends to be a shade of blue which can be shown through their skin, most boldly in the mouth area and toe pads. 

The "milk" in the common name comes from the milky fluid these frogs excrete when stressed.

Habitat 
Mission golden-eyed tree frogs inhabit humid rainforest regions. They often inhabit vegetation which extends over permanent, slow-moving water sources.

In captivity 
Trachycephalus resinifictrix is commonly found in captivity. They are relatively easy to care for, but require a significant amount of space, humidity, and regular cage maintenance to ensure a clean healthy environment for the frog. In the wild, they live in temperatures around 21-30°C, and thus prefer cages around these temperatures.

References

External links
 

Amphibians of Bolivia
Amphibians of Brazil
Amphibians of Colombia
Amphibians of Ecuador
Amphibians of French Guiana
Amphibians of Guyana
Amphibians of Peru
Amphibians of Suriname
Amphibians of Venezuela
Amphibians described in 1907
Taxa named by Émil Goeldi
Trachycephalus